is a Japanese romance visual novel released by KID for the Dreamcast and PlayStation consoles on September 27, 2001. It is the second game in the Memories Off series. The game was released for the PlayStation Portable on May 29, 2008.

Characters

 (OVA)
The protagonist of Memories Off 2nd.

The primary heroine of Memories Off 2nd, Hotaru is in her third year at Hamasaki High School. She often acts childish and immature, and is sometimes an airhead. Her favourite hobby is the piano. She confessed her love to Ken at Christmas, and in the OVA they're in a relationship, but she worries about Ken's feelings towards her. She appears in both of the Memories Off 3.5 OVA stories, and is a secondary character in Memories Off ~Sorekara~ who helps with Inori's feelings towards Isshu.

Ken's teacher at Hamasaki High School and his next door neighbour. Tsubame is a mysterious woman who often speaks in philosophical terms and has a coldhearted personality with a decadent atmosphere about her. She is the instructor of the Summer School at Hamasaki High.

Hotaru's best friend, Tomoe is also in her third year at Hamasaki High School. She works part-time at a local restaurant and is a member of the theatre club. She has an open-hearted and cheerful personality. In the OVA, Ken overhears her reciting lines from her upcoming play, but mistakes them as a confession of love at first. She fears she may steal Ken from Hotaru. Her hairstyle slightly resembles Yue Imasaka's from the original Memories Off game.

A third year student at Hamasaki High School, Takano is a member of the swimming club and a classmate of Kens. She was born in Russia and has a kind and affectionate nature. She is especially popular to underclassmen.

The older sister of Hotaru, Shizuru is in her third year of university. She is especially good at making deserts which Hotaru loves to eat. She has an interest in and is good at professional wrestling. She also has a habit of spoiling and caring about Hotaru, helping her out with her troubles with Ken. She is a kind-hearted person in nature. She also appears in the Memories Off 3.5 OVA stories with Hotaru, and is a secondary character in Memories Off ~Sorekara~, working as the deputy manager at the same restaurant as Isshu.

A second year student at Hamasaki High School, Megumi is a member of the art club and works part-time with Ken and Shin at the Ressac restaurant. She tries to keep herself busy there but her clumsy nature makes it difficult as she accidentally breaks plates on a common basis. Despite this, she tries to keep cheerful even though she's a manic-depressive.

Best friend of Ken, he is in his third year at Hamasaki High School and is the captain of the soccer club.

He works at the same place as Ken, refers to Ken as Inaken and Hotaru as Tarutaru.

Media

Anime
Memories Off 2nd has been adapted into an anime OVA series split into three episodes. The first of three DVDs went on sale on January 22, 2003. Later, a special Memories Off 2nd Special Edition ~Nocturne~ DVD was released on March 24, 2004. This DVD release is sixty minutes long and follows the same storyline as the original OVA but with a stronger focus and new footage of Hotaru Shirakawa.

Music
The soundtrack of Memories Off 2nd is composed by Takeshi Abo while the theme songs are composed by Chiyomaru Shikura. The visual novel's opening theme, was performed by Remi and its ending theme, is performed by Nana Mizuki. The anime adaptation's opening theme, "Nocturne", is also performed by Nana Mizuki  and its ending theme, "Usual place", is performed by tiaraway. The opening for the PSP version is "Eternal Memories" by Ayane, which is also used as the opening for the PSP version of the original Memories Off.

Reception
Neal Chandran of RPGFan praised the Dreamcast version Memories Off 2nd for "...the risks [the game] took to create a more mature, dynamic, slightly darker narrative and peruse difficult themes that other, more play-it-safe examples of the genre probably wouldn't touch." but he "...did not find the new cast of characters very endearing..." when compared to the original Memories Off. Overall, he gave the game a rating of 82%.

References

External links
Memories Off 2nd's PSP port's official website 

Memories Off
2001 video games
2003 anime OVAs
Bishōjo games
Drama anime and manga
Dreamcast games
IOS games
Japan-exclusive video games
KID games
PlayStation (console) games
PlayStation Portable games
Romance anime and manga
Romance video games
Video games developed in Japan
Video games scored by Takeshi Abo
Video games written by Kotaro Uchikoshi
Visual novels
Windows games